The Dodge 330 is a mid-size car automobile that was marketed by Dodge in 1962 only and is one of the first unibody vehicles utilizing the B-Body. Available in 2-door or 4-door sedan body designs designed by Virgil Exner. In 1963 the car was redesigned as a compact car on the A-Body platform which the Dart remained using until it was discontinued in 1976. The 330 name was discontinued in 1964 (1965 in Canada).   B-body.

Design 
There was also a higher trimmed 440 and Polara available.

The base engine was the 225 Slant-Six. The 318 2bbl, 361 2bbl, 383 2bbl, 383 4bbl, and 426 4bbl were optional.

As an intermediate trim level above the Dart, it came standard with a cigarette lighter, front foam cushions, and rear arm rests.

It was available in both years, mostly ordered as a super stocker for the race tracks.

For the 1965 model year, full-sized Dodges were built on the new C Body with a  wheelbase, and the 330 and 440 were both replaced by the new, bigger Polara. The 880 now took the Polara's former place in the lineup.  In Canada, however, the 330 was continued for one more year as the base model full-size Dodge (using the new-for-1965 body).

References

External links

1963 Dodge 330 Photograph
1963 Dodge 330 station wagon at the 1962 to 1965 Mopar Web Site
1963 Dodge 330 model car
1964 Dodge 330 model car

330
Cars introduced in 1962
Cars discontinued in 1964
Rear-wheel-drive vehicles
Mid-size cars
Coupés
Sedans
Station wagons